Webster "City Late" Lichaba (born 6 October 1954) is a retired South African football (soccer) midfielder who played for Orlando Pirates, Atlanta Chiefs and Jomo Cosmos.

Youth career
Born in Mzimhlophe, he lived a street away from Ryder Mofokeng. He played for White City Lucky Brothers with Mofokeng.

Orlando Pirates
When he was signed from Mzimhlophe Callies at age 19, he became a teammate of Jomo Sono. He captained them and won three league titles with Pirates.

Atlanta Chiefs
When he moved to America in 1980 the chairman was Ted Turner, the founder of CNN. He nearly earned 100 appearances for Chiefs. He also appeared in a handful of indoor matches for the Chiefs at that time

Jomo Cosmos
Lichaba was brought back to his home country by his retired former teammate Jomo Sono who had acquired a team. In the 1986 season, he set the record for the most starts in a season, 46. That feat was also achieved by Helman Mkhalele in 1993. He retired at the age of 37.

After Retirement
In 2001, he became an assistant coach at Supersport United and their team manager in 2003 onwards. He is also the junior academy's scout.

Personal life
He is married to Buyi Radebe-Lichaba. He is the father of 4 girls, Nthabiseng, Neo, Tlholo as well as South African award winning singer, Lira.

References

1954 births
Living people
Association football midfielders
South African soccer players
South African expatriate soccer players
Sportspeople from Soweto
Atlanta Chiefs players
North American Soccer League (1968–1984) players
North American Soccer League (1968–1984) indoor players
Expatriate soccer players in the United States
South African expatriate sportspeople in the United States
Jomo Cosmos F.C. players
Orlando Pirates F.C. players
South African soccer managers